The Latham Trimotor was a large French trimotor biplane built just after World War I and used in small numbers by the French Navy.

Design and development

The Latham Trimotor (its Latham type number is not known) was a large biplane, with unequal span, blunted rectangular plan wings with high aspect ratio for the time. The wings were built around a pair of spars constructed from spruce and poplar plywood. They were fabric covered and in three parts, a central section attached to the upper hull and two outer sections divided into two bays with three vertical pairs of parallel interplane struts, the innermost at the junction with the central section.  The upper wing centre section was supported over the fuselage by a transverse inverted V-strut to the forward longeron and by two vertical struts to the rear longeron.  Outboard, the overhangs of the upper wing were supported by outward leaning pairs of struts from the feet of the outer interplane pairs; below these points small, flat bottomed floats which provided lateral stability on water were mounted.    Its ailerons were balanced and mounted only on the upper wing; they were short, reaching outwards from the outer interplane struts.

All three  Panhard-Levassor 12Cb V-12 engines were mounted midway between the wings in the central section on steel frames. The outer two were in tractor configuration and the central one, mounted above the fuselage, was a pusher. They had rectangular radiators in front of them.  Each drove a four blade propeller. In order for the central propeller to clear the fuselage the central engine was mounted higher than the others and the chord of the upper wing reduced to provide a trailing edge cut-away for propeller clearance.  Their three  fuel tanks were in the fuselage forward and aft of the space for bombs, passengers or cargo; fuel was pumped from these to a feeder tank in the upper wing so that the engines could be gravity fed.

The hull of the Trimotor was ash framed and covered with poplar or birch plywood. The forward planing hull had soft chine, ending at a single, shallow step under the wings. Ii was divided internally into seven inter-accessible compartments.  The first held a machine gunner's post in the extreme nose and the second a side-by-side open pilot's cockpit with dual controls midway between the nose and the leading edge of the wing. The flight engineer shared the third compartment with the two forward fuel tanks, with access through a dorsal hatch and lit by a porthole in the roof. The fourth and fifth compartments housed useful load and fuel respectively. In the more slender fuselage aft of the step the sixth compartment was empty but in the seventh housed the dorsal gunner's cockpit and the radio operator's cabin, lit by side portholes.

The hull became slender towards the rear and curved upwards to support a biplane, constant chord horizontal tail with balanced elevators on its upper and lower planes. The lower elevator was in two parts with a central V-shaped cut-out.  Between the planes were three fins, each carrying a rudder; the outer pair were trapezoidal in shape to allow elevator movement but the central one was rounded and deeper, moving in the elevator cut-out.

Operational history

The date of the Trimotor's first flight is not known.  Though a contemporary report in August 1920 noting the satisfactory completion of tests at the Latham factory at Caudebec-en-Caux and describing it as the new "High Seas" flying boat suggests a date around the spring of 1920, a modern account gives 1919.

Four Trimotors were ordered by the Marine française. When the first was tested the Navy complained that alighting contact was very hard and so Latham revised the planing surface, giving it harder chine (a steeper V) and used this on the other three Naval Trimotors, giving then gentle landing characteristics.  They could carry four "large" bombs".

No civil sales were made but ten were bought for military use.

Specifications

References

Bibliography

Flying boats
1910s French military aircraft
Latham aircraft
Three-engined push-pull aircraft
Aircraft first flown in 1919